Reza Khaleghifar is an Iranian football player who is playing for Sanat Naft Abadan in the Persian Gulf Pro League.

Club career statistics 

Assist Goals

Statistics accurate as of match played 31 July 2014

References

Iranian footballers
Iran international footballers
1983 births
Living people
Persian Gulf Pro League players
Fajr Sepasi players
Saipa F.C. players
Sanat Naft Abadan F.C. players
Rah Ahan players
Persepolis F.C. players
Gostaresh Foulad F.C. players
People from Babol
Association football forwards
Pars Jonoubi Jam players
Sportspeople from Mazandaran province